Lorenzo Juan Sigaut (born 6 June 1933) is an Argentine economist.

Minister of Economy

He served as Minister of Economy of Argentina from April to December 1981, during the dictatorship of Roberto Eduardo Viola.

His term in office was marked by high inflation, external debt crisis and capital flight, that provoked an economic crisis which resulted in his replacement by Roberto Alemann.

His infamous quote "Anybody who bets on the dollar will lose" (El que apueste al dólar perderá), referring to those who had savings in United States dollars, became the laughing stock of Argentine economists for decades.

Bibliography

References

1933 births
Argentine people of French descent
Argentine economists
Argentine Ministers of Finance
Living people